The GP3 Series, or GP3 for short, was a single-seater motor racing series launched in 2010 as a feeder series for the GP2 Series, introduced by GP2 organiser Bruno Michel. GP3 followed the entire European leg of the Formula One series and the GP2 (now Formula 2) series as a support race for the two. Like the GP2 series, GP3 gave drivers the experience of the Grand Prix environment, and took advantage of the infrastructure, such as marshals and medical facilities, in place for the Formula One events. GP3 Series mainly raced on European circuits, but had appearances on other international race tracks, with rounds in the 2015 season at the Bahrain International Circuit in Bahrain and the Yas Marina Circuit in United Arab Emirates.

Many drivers had since stepped up to GP2 since the series began, with the 2010 champion Esteban Gutiérrez, Pål Varhaug and ninth-place finisher Stefano Coletti being the first to do so for the 2011 season. 2011 champion Valtteri Bottas did not follow suit, however, and instead joined Williams as a reserve driver. Meanwhile, James Calado, Rio Haryanto, Simon Trummer, Tom Dillmann and Nigel Melker all joined GP2 for the 2012 season. Other drivers who have graduated to other series are James Jakes who moved to the IndyCar Series for 2011, Josef Newgarden to the Indy Lights series in 2011 and Alexander Rossi and Robert Wickens who moved to the Formula Renault 3.5 Series in 2011 and Lewis Williamson in 2012.

In the series' short history, thirteen drivers have gone on to compete in Formula One. These include former champions Gutiérrez, Daniil Kvyat, Bottas, Esteban Ocon,
Jean-Éric Vergne, Carlos Sainz Jr., and Charles Leclerc.

In 2019 the series merged with the FIA Formula 3 European Championship and became the FIA Formula 3 Championship.

GP3 Series cars
The GP3 Series car was a standardised car used by all of the competing teams.

Dallara GP3/10

For the 2010–2012 seasons, the GP3 series used the GP3/10 chassis.

Chassis The car had been designed and built by Dallara, who currently produces the F2 chassis.

Engine The GP3/10 used a race-tuned four-cylinder 2.0-litre turbocharged 280 hp engine developed by Renault Sport (based on B20F engine), while turbochargers were supplied by Pankl Racing Systems. The wastegate was included due to turbocharger rules.

Gearbox The GP3/10 used a 6 speed longitudinal sequential Hewland gearbox.

Tyres Pirelli supplied the tyres for GP3 from 2010 to 2012, same supplier for the GP2 Series.

Specifications
Engine displacement:  DOHC inline-4
Gearbox: 6-speed paddle shift gearbox (must have reverse)
Weight: 
Power output: 
Fuel: Elf LMS 102 RON unleaded
Fuel capacity: 
Fuel delivery: Direct fuel injection
Aspiration: Single-turbocharged
Turbo boost pressure: 
Length: 
Width: 
Wheelbase: 
Steering:  Non-assisted rack and pinion
Tyres: Pirelli P Zero slick dry and treaded wet

Dallara GP3/13

For the 2013–2015 seasons, the GP3 series used the GP3/13 chassis.

Chassis The car was also designed and built by Dallara.

Engine The GP3/13 used a naturally aspirated 3.4-litre V6 400 hp engine, developed by AER Ltd. with designation P57.

Gearbox The GP3/13 used a 6 speed longitudinal sequential gearbox developed by Hewland.

Tyres Pirelli continued to supply the tyres for GP3 from 2013 onwards.

Specifications
Engine displacement:  DOHC V6
Gearbox: 6-speed paddle shift gearbox (must have reverse)
Weight: 
Power output: 
Fuel: Elf LMS 102 RON unleaded
Fuel capacity: 
Fuel delivery: Fuel injection
Aspiration: Naturally-aspirated
Length: 
Width: 
Wheelbase: 
Steering:  Non-assisted rack and pinion
Tyres: Pirelli P Zero slick dry and Pirelli Cinturato treaded wet

Dallara GP3/16

The series used another new chassis for the 2016 season, and continued to be used until 2018.

Chassis The car has also been designed and built by Dallara.

Engine The GP3/16 used a naturally aspirated 3.4-litre V6 400 hp engine, developed by Mecachrome with model V634, prepared and maintained by Teos Engineering.

Gearbox The GP3/16 used a 6 speed longitudinal sequential gearbox developed by Hewland.

Tyres Pirelli continued to supply the tyres for GP3 from 2016 to the 2018 season.

Specifications
Engine displacement:  DOHC V6
Gearbox: 6-speed paddle shift gearbox (must have reverse)
Weight: 
Power output: 
Fuel: Elf LMS 102 RON unleaded
Fuel capacity: 
Fuel delivery: Direct fuel injection
Aspiration: naturally aspirated
Length: 
Width: 
Wheelbase: 
Steering:  Non-assisted rack and pinion
Tyres: Pirelli P Zero slick dry and Pirelli Cinturato treaded wet

Race weekend
A race weekend features one 45-minute practice session on Friday, and one 30-minute qualifying session on Saturday, followed by two races. The qualifying session is a straight fight for the fastest laptime, and determines the order of the grid for Saturday's Race 1.

Race 2 is on Sunday. The grid is decided by the Saturday result with top 8 being reversed, so the driver who finished 8th on Saturday will start from pole position and the winner will start from 8th place.

The distance of each race is decided prior to the event, however, should 30 minutes elapse before the designated number of laps are completed the lead driver will be shown the chequered flag.

Points system

2010–2011

Pole for Saturday races: 2 points
Fastest lap: 1 point in each race
Driver recording fastest lap has to drive 90% of race laps and must finish in the top ten of the race to be eligible for the fastest lap point.
With this points system, the most points anyone can score in one round is 20 by claiming pole position, winning both races with the fastest lap in each race.

No driver ever did manage to get maximum points with this system. The closest drivers who have done so are Esteban Gutiérrez at the 2010 British round, who managed pole position for the feature race, won the feature race and got the fastest lap, and then came third in the sprint race, which equals a total of 17 points. Valtteri Bottas at the 2011 Hungarian round achieved pole position and won the feature race, and then came second in the sprint race, also totaling 17 points.

2012 onwards

Pole for Saturday races: 4 points
Fastest lap: 2 points in each race
Driver recording fastest lap has to drive 90% of race laps and must finish in the top ten of the race to be eligible for the fastest lap point.
With this points system, the most points anyone can score in one round is 48 by claiming pole position, winning both races with the fastest lap in each race.

So far throughout the new points system, no driver has achieved the maximum number of points in a single round. In the Hungarian round of 2012, António Félix da Costa became first driver to win both races of the weekend.

Teams and drivers
GP3 Series has ten European teams and thirty drivers representing the Series. Manor Racing, Atech CRS GP and Carlin represent Great Britain, whilst flying the French flag is GP2 Series 2009 Champions ART Grand Prix and Tech 1 Racing. MW Arden in association with ex-Formula One driver Mark Webber race under an Australian license. Spaniard Addax Team, German RSC Mücke Motorsport in association with Ralf Schumacher, Irish-Canadian Status Grand Prix, and Swiss team Jenzer Motorsport complete the lineup.

Champions

Drivers'

Teams'

Drivers graduated to GP2

Notes:
 Drivers are listed by their last year in GP3 Series. Usually they started in GP2 at the start of the following season.
 Gold background denotes GP3 champion.
 † Coletti had three GP2 starts in 2009 for Durango; his first GP2 team since driving in GP3 2010 was Trident Racing. Ceccon also had 8 starts in GP2 with Scuderia Coloni; he joined Trident Racing for 2013 after a year of GP3 in 2012.
 ‡ Denotes drivers who raced in the now defunct GP2 Asia Series.
 Gutiérrez, Calado, Dillmann, Coletti, Haryanto, Melker, Trummer and Ceccon all participated in the 2 race 2011 GP2 Final.
 Jakes raced in the 2008–2009, 2009–2010 and 2011 Asia Series along with two races in the 2010 Main GP2 series.
 Also, António Félix da Costa and Alexander Rossi raced in the final (non-championship) round of the 2011 GP2 Series season at Yas Marina.

Drivers graduated to FIA Formula 2

Notes:
 Gold background denotes GP3 champion.

Drivers graduated to Formula One

Notes:
 Gold background denotes GP3 champion.

Seasons

2010

The 2010 GP3 Series was the inaugural season of the Series. The championship was contested over sixteen races held at eight rounds, beginning on May 8 at Circuit de Catalunya and ending on September 12 at Autodromo Nazionale Monza. The title was clinched by ART Grand Prix driver Esteban Gutiérrez at the final round by taking pole position, who won the championship 17 points clear of Robert Wickens in second, who was a further 18 points ahead of third place driver Nico Müller.

2011

The season began at Istanbul Park on 7 May and concluded at Autodromo Nazionale Monza on 11 September after eight rounds made up of two races each and all in support of European Formula 1 Grands Prix. The title was claimed by Valtteri Bottas who was only 7 points ahead of his teammate James Calado in second, while Nigel Melker finished 17 points adrift in third. This was to be ART Grand Prix's second championship in as many seasons.

2012

The season began on 12 May at Catalunya, Barcelona, and finished at the Autodromo Nazionale Monza on 9 September. It supported the entire European leg of the 2012 Formula One Season again and included the series' first visit to Monte Carlo, Monaco.

Going into the final round of the season, four drivers were in with a chance of winning the championship, but ultimately a move on the penultimate lap gave Mitch Evans the title with 151.5 points, only beating Daniel Abt by just two points on 149.5 while António Félix da Costa finished off the top three with 132 points. The teams title was also won during the last round by Lotus GP, their third title in as many seasons. The season was also the last for the first-generation chassis, the GP3/10.

2013

The season began on 11 May at Catalunya, Barcelona, and finished at the Yas Marina Circuit, Abu Dhabi on 3 November. It followed most of the European leg of the 2013 Formula One season again other than Monaco, and for the first time it hosted a non-European race at the last round in Abu Dhabi. It also saw the début of the series second-generation chassis, the Dallara GP3/13.

The title was clinched by Daniil Kvyat at the final round with 168 points, beating Facu Regalia by 30 points on 138 while Conor Daly finished off the top three with 126 points. The teams title was won by ART Grand Prix, their fourth title in as many seasons.

2014

The season began on 10 May at Catalunya, Barcelona, and finished at the Yas Marina Circuit, Abu Dhabi on 23 November. It once again followed most of the European leg of the 2014 Formula One season other than Monte Carlo, Monaco and the only non-European race at the last round in Abu Dhabi.

The title was clinched by Alex Lynn at the final round with 207 points, beating Dean Stoneman by 44 points on 163 while Marvin Kirchhöfer finished off the top three with 161 points. For the first time, the teams title was won by Carlin, becoming the first and only team other than ART Grand Prix to take the teams title.

2015

The season began on 9 May at Catalunya, Barcelona, and finished at the Yas Marina Circuit, Abu Dhabi on 29 November. It was contested over 18 races at nine rounds. There were nine teams with three cars each. Esteban Ocon won the title by 8 points despite winning only one race compared to second placed Luca Ghiotto winning five races. Ocon did however finish on the podium 14 times. The teams title was won by ART Grand Prix, their fifth title. This season was the last with the GP3/13 chassis.

2016

The season began on 14 May at Catalunya, Barcelona, and finished at the Yas Marina Circuit, Abu Dhabi on 27 November. It was contested over 18 races at nine rounds. There were seven teams with three to four cars each, with DAMS making its debut. The title was clinched by Charles Leclerc at the final round with 202 points, beating Alexander Albon by 25 points on 177 while Antonio Fuoco finished off the top three with 157 points. The teams title was won by ART Grand Prix at Monza, their sixth title. This season was the first with the series' third-generation chassis, the GP3/16.

2017

The season began on 13 May at Catalunya, Barcelona and finished at the Yas Marina Circuit, Abu Dhabi on 26 November. It was contested at 18 races at nine rounds. George Russell, Jack Aitken and Nirei Fukuzumi ended the season in the top 3 with ART Grand Prix. All drivers at the end of the season joined the 2018 FIA Formula 2 Championship. The second race at Italy was cancelled after heavy rain during the 2017 Italian Grand Prix. This season saw the series introduce the Drag Reduction System (DRS) used in Formula One and Formula 2.

2018

The final season of the series started on 12 May in Barcelona, and finished on 26 November at Yas Marina. The season was again contested of 9 rounds and 18 races. The final driver's title went to Frenchman Anthoine Hubert who drove for ART, take 2 victories, 11 podiums, 2 pole positions, and 4 fastest laps, with 214 points. ART Grand Prix won the final constructor's title, winning all but one constructor's titles in the series. It was also the last season with the GP3/16 chassis. With 198 points scored, Nikita Mazepin became runner-up with 4 victories, 8 podiums, 1 pole position and most 5 fastest laps. After a disaster weekend for Hubert in Red Bull Ring, it was his teammate, who retook the lead, but only in this round. Finally, Callum Ilott down to third, behind second place, but ultimately get to the top three and scored 167 points with 2 victories, 7 podiums, 1 pole position, and 2 fastest laps.

See also
 List of GP3 Series drivers
 GP2 Series
 GP2 Asia Series
 Formula One
 Formula Two
 Formula Three
 International Formula Master

References

External links

 GP3 Series official site
 GP3 Series Info Blog (Polish)

 
GP3
GP3
One-make series
Recurring sporting events established in 2010
Recurring sporting events disestablished in 2018
2010 establishments in Europe
2010 establishments in Asia
2018 disestablishments in Europe
2018 disestablishments in Asia